This is a list of Estonian football transfers in the winter transfer window 2018–19 by club. Only transfers related to Meistriliiga clubs are included.

This transfer window was open between the 2018 Meistriliiga and the 2019 Meistriliiga season. 1 club was changed: Maardu Linnameeskond joined Estonian top division after the relegation of Pärnu Vaprus.

Meistriliiga

Nõmme Kalju

In: 

Out:

FCI Levadia

In: 

Out:

Flora Tallinn

In: 

Out:

Narva Trans

In: 

Out:

Paide Linnameeskond

In: 

Out:

Tartu Tammeka

In: 

Out:

Viljandi Tulevik

In: 

Out:

Tallinna Kalev

In: 

Out:

Kuressaare

In: 

Out:

Maardu Linnameeskond

In: 

Out:

See also
 2019 Meistriliiga

References

External links
 Official site of the Estonian Football Association
 Official site of the Meistriliiga

Estonian
transfers
transfers
2018–19